Mount Gongga, also known as Minya Konka (Khams Tibetan pinyin: Mi'nyâg Gong'ga Riwo) and colloquially as "The King of Sichuan Mountains", is the highest mountain in Sichuan province, China. This makes it the third highest peak in the world outside of the Himalaya/Karakoram range, after Tirich Mir and Kongur Tagh, and the easternmost  peak in the world. It is situated in the Daxue Shan mountain range, between Dadu River and Yalong River, and is part of the Hengduan mountainous region. From it comes the Hailuogou glacier. 

The peak has large vertical relief over the deep nearby gorges.

Mountaineering history
The first western explorers in this region heard reports of an extremely high mountain and sought it out. An early remote measurement of the mountain, then called Bokunka, was first performed by the expedition of Graf Béla Széchenyi between 1877 and 1880.

Forty-five years later, the mountain, this time called Gang ka, was sketched by missionary J. H. Edgar from a distance.

This measurement was immediately viewed with suspicion, and the Society's decision to check Rock's calculations before publication was well-founded.

In 1930 Swiss geographer Eduard Imhof led an expedition that measured the altitude of the mountain to be . A richly illustrated large-format book about the expedition was eventually published by Imhof, Die Großen Kalten Berge von Szetchuan (Orell Fussli Verlag, Zurich, 1974). The book includes many color paintings by Imhof, including images of the Tibetan monastery at the foot of the sacred mountain. The monastery was almost completely destroyed during the Cultural Revolution, around 1972–74.

A properly equipped American team composed of Terris Moore, Richard Burdsall, Arthur B. Emmons, and Jack T. Young returned to the mountain in 1932 and performed an accurate survey of the peak and its environs. Moore and Burdsall succeeded in climbing to the summit by starting on the west side of the mountain and climbing the Northwest Ridge. This was a remarkable achievement at the time, considering the height of the mountain, its remoteness, and the small size of the group. In addition, this peak was the highest summit reached by Americans until 1958 (though Americans had by that time climbed to higher non-summit points). The book written by the expedition members, Men Against The Clouds, remains a mountaineering classic.

In May 1957 a Chinese mountaineering team claimed to have climbed Minya Konka via the Northwest Ridge route established by Moore and Burdsall. Six people reached the summit with limited climbing experience and primitive equipment, although four climbers died in the effort.

For political reasons, this region of China was made inaccessible to foreign climbers after the 1930s. In 1980 the region was again opened to foreign expeditions. American Lance Owens was the first foreigner to receive permission from the People's Republic of China to lead a mountaineering expedition in China and Tibet, allowing him to climb Gongga Shan (Minya Konka) in 1980. This expedition opened the modern era of American climbing in China. The expedition, organized by Owens and sponsored by the American Alpine Club, attempted the still unclimbed and extremely technical west face of Minya Konka. Members of the expedition included Louis Reichardt, Andrew Harvard, Gary Bocarde, Jed Williamson, and Henry Barber.

Deaths on the Mountain
A large number of mountaineering deaths have occurred on Gongga Shan, which has deservedly earned a reputation as a difficult and dangerous mountain. While the first ascent route up the Northwest Ridge appears technically straightforward, it is plagued by avalanches due to the mountain's highly unpredictable weather. During the 1957 Chinese ascent of the peak, four of nine climbers died. In 1980 an American climber died in an avalanche on the Northwest Ridge route.  In an unsuccessful 1981 attempt on the peak, eight Japanese climbers died in a fall. As of 1999, more climbers had died trying to climb the mountain than had reached the summit.

In 2003, The SummitPost reported the mountain had been successfully climbed only eight times. In total, 22 climbers had reached the summit and 16 climbers had died in the effort.  (These statistics may not take into account the four Chinese climbers killed in the 1957 expedition.)

The Himalayan Index lists five ascents of Gongga Shan between 1982 and 2002, and about seven unsuccessful attempts. There have been several attempts in years since then, which are unlisted in this index.

In October 2017, Chinese media reported that Pavel Kořínek, a Czech national, had reached the top of Gongga Shan, marking the first time since 2002 that the mountain had been successfully climbed. The article summarized the climbing history of Gongga Shan (Minya Konka) as follows:

References

Jill Neate, High Asia: An Illustrated History of the 7000 Metre Peaks,

Further reading
 Michael Brandtner: Minya Konka Schneeberge im Osten Tibets. Die Entdeckung eines Alpin-Paradieses. Detjen-Verlag, Hamburg 2006, 
 Arnold Heim: Minya Gongkar. Verlag Hans Huber, Bern–Berlin 1933
 Eduard Imhof: Die großen kalten Berge von Szetschuan. Orell Füssli Verlag, Zürich 1974

External links

 Corrected versions of SRTM digital elevation data
 Trekking Tour to Mt.Minya Konka
 Gongga Shan Travel and Trekking Guide on Chinabackpacker

Mountains of Sichuan
Mount Gongga